Señorita República Dominicana 1956 was held on January 29, 1956. There were 24 candidates who competed for the national crown. The winner represented the Dominican Republic at the Miss Universe 1956. On the top 10 they showed their evening gown so they could go to the top 5. In the top 5 they would answer more questions. This edition would send their first delegate to Miss Universe.

Results

Señorita República Dominicana 1956 : Olga Fernánda Fiallo Oliva de los Rosario (Distrito de Santo Domingo)
1st Runner Up : Alexandra Ferro (Colón)
2nd Runner Up : Isaura de Palmera (Beata)
3rd Runner Up : Sara Abreu (Puerto Plata)
4th Runner Up : Carmen Castro (Provincia de Jarabacoa)

Top 10

Tatiana Zamora (Santiago)
María Taveras (Trujillo)
Concepción Veras (Duarte)
Altagracia Oviedo (Salcedo)
Laura Silvestre (Samaná)

Delegates

 Azua - Germania Angie Alvarez Rosa
 Baoruco - Angelica Sandra Zamiera Sosa
 Barahona - Anjelika Eduarda Fermin Tavarez
 Beata - Isuara Joana de Palmera Ruiz
 Benefactor - Tatiana Germania Quiros Valle
 Colón - Alexandra Margarita Ferro Rodríguez
 Distrito de Santo Domingo - Olga Fernánda Fiallo Oliva de los Rosario
 Duarte - Concepción de Ursula Veras Castañeda
 Espaillat - Ana Josefina Horlanda Peralta
 José Trujillo Valdez - Ana Cassandra Eros Fausto
 La Altagracia - Remedios Veronica de Rojas Melilla
 La Vega - Arelis del Carmen Mena Cabrera
 Libertador - Mary Lionas Peña Arias
 Monte Cristi - María Teresa Martínez Derios
 Provincia de Jarabacoa - Carmen de Dolores Castro de Zaragoza
 Puerto Plata - Sara Magdalena de Dolores Abreu Suarez
Salcedo - Altagracia Leonida Oviedo Peralta
 Samaná - Laura Carina Silvestre Adames
 San Pedro de Macorís - María Eugenia Reynosa Reys
 San Rafael - Elizabeth del Carmen Espinal Hidalgo
 Santiago - Tatiana Ceneyda Zamora Vargas
 Santiago Rodríguez - María Angelica Ferrano Urtoda
 Séibo - Isabela Rosa Guerrero Meran
 Trujillo - María Casilda Taveras Collado

Trivia

Alexandra Ferro was one of the first people to be born from the Island of Catalina. She was also the tallest measuring 6 ft 3 in or 190 cm. Her parents and her family comes from La Romana.

Miss Dominican Republic
1956 beauty pageants
1956 in the Dominican Republic